Boff may refer to:

People
Andrew Boff (born 1958), British politician
Boff Whalley (born 1961), British guitarist and playwright
Clodovis Boff (born 1944), Brazilian Roman Catholic theologian, philosopher, writer, and professor; brother of Leonardo
Leonardo Boff (born 1938), Brazilian theologian, philosopher, writer, and former Catholic priest; brother of Clodovis

Other
A shortened version of the word Boffin
Boffing, a term for sparring with foam weapons
Sam on Boffs' Island, a British educational television series in the 1970s